Lysimachia barystachys, the Manchurian yellow loosestrife, is a species of flowering plant in the family Primulaceae. It is widely distributed in northern, eastern and central China, Far Eastern Russia, the Korean Peninsula and Japan, and has been introduced in the US state of Georgia. It has gained the Royal Horticultural Society's Award of Garden Merit.

References

barystachys
Flora of Inner Mongolia
Flora of Manchuria
Flora of North-Central China
Flora of Southeast China
Flora of Japan
Flora of Korea
Flora of Amur Oblast
Flora of Khabarovsk Krai
Flora of Primorsky Krai
Plants described in 1833
Taxa named by Alexander von Bunge